Nowell is a masculine English given name derived from Noël, meaning Christmas in French.

Notable people with the name include:
Nowell Myres (1902–1989), British archaeologist
Nowell Parr (1864–1933), British architect
Nowell Salmon (1835–1912), Royal Navy officer
Nowell Sotherton (died c. 1610), English politician
Nowell Twopeny (1819–1869), English priest

See also 
 Noel (given name)

English masculine given names